W. H. Rorke was an American football player and coach.  He served the fifth head football coach at New York University (NYU). He held that position for two seasons, from 1901 until 1902, leading the NYU Violets to a record of 9–6–1.  The one tie game he coached was in the 1901 season against Union on November 23.  The game ended in a score of 11–11.  He attended Poly Prep Country Day School as well as NYU, playing football at the latter.

Head coaching record

References

Year of birth missing
Year of death missing
NYU Violets football coaches
NYU Violets football players
Poly Prep alumni